Brigadier-General John Hardress Lloyd  (14 August 1874 – 28 February 1952) was an Anglo-Irish soldier and polo player. He was awarded a DSO and made a Chevalier of the Légion d’Honneur for his service in the British Army during the First World War. As a polo player he won a silver medal with the Ireland team at the 1908 Summer Olympics.

Biography
Hardress Lloyd was born into an Anglo-Irish family with connections to County Offaly. He was the son of John Lloyd, a lawyer, and Susanna Frances Julia Colclough. He was the second of their seven children and their oldest son. On 5 August 1903 he married Adeline Wilson. They did not have any children. Hardress-Lloyd is the great uncle of John Lloyd, the TV producer behind the Blackadder series.

Polo player
As a polo player, Hardress Lloyd, together with John Paul McCann, Percy O'Reilly and Auston Rotheram, was a member of the Ireland team that won a silver medal at the 1908 Summer Olympics. The Ireland team was part of the Great Britain Olympic team. In 1911 he also captained the England team that played in the United States

British Army soldier
Hardress Lloyd was commissioned a second lieutenant in the 4th Royal Irish Dragoon Guards on 10 October 1894. He was promoted to lieutenant on 1 July 1896, and served in the Tirah Campaign on the North West Frontier in 1897–98. Joining the 21st Lancers in South Africa for the Second Boer War, he served as aide-de-camp to Lieutenant-General Sir Edward Locke Elliot between 26 March 1901 and September 1902. He resigned his commission in the 21st Lancers on 8 October 1902.

On the outbreak of the First World War he served on the Western Front before joining Major-General Beauvoir De Lisle's 1st Cavalry Division staff. He followed De Lisle to Gallipoli when the latter took command of the 29th Division. Hardress Lloyd was appointed second in command of the 1st Battalion Royal Inniskilling Fusiliers in May 1916, becoming its commanding officer a month later. Whilst commanding this battalion he was awarded the DSO in January 1917. In February 1917 he was appointed commander of D Battalion, one of the founding units of the Heavy Branch Machine Gun Corps.

The battalion's first actions were at the Battle of Arras (1917) and included the disastrous Bullecourt operation in April 1917. The 3rd Tank Brigade was formed under his command on 27 April 1917 and Hardress-Lloyd remained in charge of this brigade until the war ended. He was promoted to Brigadier-General on 16 April 1918 and a Bar was added to his DSO in July. He was also mentioned in despatches six times and appointed a Chevalier of the Légion d’Honneur.

References

External links
 

1874 births
1952 deaths
British Army brigadiers
Members of the Ireland polo team at the 1908 Summer Olympics
20th-century Anglo-Irish people
English polo players
British Army personnel of the Second Boer War
Royal Inniskilling Fusiliers officers
4th Royal Irish Dragoon Guards officers
Chevaliers of the Légion d'honneur
Companions of the Distinguished Service Order
High Sheriffs of King's County
Irish officers in the British Army
Roehampton Trophy
International Polo Cup
British military personnel of the Tirah campaign
British Army cavalry generals of World War I
Medalists at the 1908 Summer Olympics
Olympic silver medallists for Great Britain
Olympic medalists in polo